Big Bald Mountain is the highest peak in Gilmer County, Georgia, U.S. and is in the Rich Mountain Wilderness, which is administered as a component of the Chattahoochee National Forest.

Description
Many of the mountains in this area are covered in a deep, black porter's loam. The vegetation in the area consists of second-growth hardwood forests.

Big Bald Mountain's summit is inside the Rich Mountain Wildlife Management Area.
It is also the 19th tallest mountain in the state of Georgia using a 160 feet prominence rule.

Hiking
No trails pass over Big Bald Mountain's summit. However, hikers can climb to the summit by hiking off-trail from Rich Mountain Road, a former logging road running through the Rich Mountains.

See also
List of mountains in Georgia (U.S. state)

References

External links 
Topographical map of Big Bald Mountain

Mountains of Gilmer County, Georgia
Mountains of Georgia (U.S. state)
Chattahoochee-Oconee National Forest